Asian Fortune is an Asian American interest English language newspaper published in the Washington, D.C. Metropolitan Area.  Founded in 1993, its circulation is 35,000 with 800 outlets in the region. It claims to be the only English language newspaper serving the entire Asian American community, including East Asians, South East Asians, and South Asians. The newspaper's focus and tone is Pan-Asianism. The newspaper covers everything from local news and politics, arts and entertainment, and food and dining.

History
Asian Fortune was founded in 1993 by Asian American publisher Jay Chen. When he died in 2011, his daughter Lily Chen became the publisher.

Past Columnists

 Jenny Chen, "Youth Voices"
 Lily Qi, "Qulture Matters"
 Sharon Heffley, "Speaking Successfully"

External links
 Official Website

Asian-American culture in Virginia
Newspapers published in Washington, D.C.
Pan-Asianism
Asian-American culture in Washington, D.C.
Newspapers established in 1993
1993 establishments in the United States